Black Rose is a pinball machine designed by John Trudeau and Brian Eddy and produced by Midway (released under the Bally name). The game features a pirate theme and was advertised with the slogan "This game is loaded!". Bally abandoned the idea to use black pinballs for the machine.

Gameplay
The basic goal of the game is to sink ships. The game features a rotating cannon situated underneath the playfield used to aim the ball at targets to award letters in the word "SINK SHIP". During multiball you also get letters for shooting flashing ramps. Once SINK SHIP is spelled, you load the cannon to light the center shot (the "Broadside") to get big points.

Legacy
Black Rose was available as a licensed table for The Pinball Arcade on several platforms until June 30th, 2018, is included as a part of Williams Pinball: Volume 2 for Pinball FX 3, and is also included in Williams Pinball Classics (2001) by Encore for Microsoft Windows.

See also
Pirates of the Caribbean (pinball)

References

External links
Internet Pinball Database entry for Black Rose
Pinball Archive Rule Sheet: Black Rose

1992 pinball machines
Bally pinball machines